Charles Arthur Rueber (August 9, 1883 – September 1, 1968; sometimes spelled Reuber) was an American football and baseball player, coach of football, basketball, and baseball, and college athletics administrator.

Playing career
Rueber was a starting halfback at Northwestern University in 1905.

He also spent one summer playing minor league baseball for the Bartlesville Indians and Chanute Browns of the Kansas State League in 1906.

Coaching career
He served as the head football coach at Whitworth University in Spokane, Washington (1907–1908) and North Dakota State University (then known as the North Dakota Agricultural School) from 1909 to 1912. At the latter school, he also served as the head baseball coach (1909–1913).

Head coaching record

Football

References

External links
 

1883 births
1968 deaths
American football halfbacks
Baseball pitchers
College men's basketball head coaches in the United States
North Dakota State Bison athletic directors
North Dakota State Bison baseball coaches
North Dakota State Bison football coaches
North Dakota State Bison men's basketball coaches
Northwestern Wildcats baseball players
Northwestern Wildcats football players
Whitworth Pirates football coaches